Divie Duffield (March 8, 1870 – July 14, 1935) was an American rower. He competed in the men's single sculls event at the 1904 Summer Olympics.

References

External links
 

1870 births
1935 deaths
American male rowers
Olympic rowers of the United States
Rowers at the 1904 Summer Olympics
Rowers from Detroit